Sukhvinderjeet Singh Kulwant (born 29 October 1960) is a Malaysian field hockey player. He competed in the men's tournament at the 1984 Summer Olympics.

References

External links
 

1960 births
Living people
Malaysian people of Punjabi descent
Malaysian sportspeople of Indian descent
Malaysian male field hockey players
Olympic field hockey players of Malaysia
Field hockey players at the 1984 Summer Olympics
Place of birth missing (living people)